Animation Mentor is an online animation school that teaches students character animation skills. Headquartered in Emeryville, California, the school offers a 6 core animation courses in addition to Creatures and Maya Workshops where students are taught by “mentors,” experienced animators who are professionals working in the animation industry. 
Animation Mentor is a distance learning school at which animation professionals teach character animation to students in over 105 countries.

History
The school was founded in 2005 by three working animators: Bobby Beck, who is the CEO and president of the school, Shawn Kelly, who is a working animator at Industrial Light & Magic, and Carlos Baena, who is a working animator. The school opened on March 27, 2005, with 350 students and 5 employees.

Academics
Animation Mentor is an online learning institution and operates 24 hours a day, seven days a week. The program includes live Q&A sessions with mentors from the animation industry, and mentors provide audio-visual critiques of weekly assignments. Graduates of the program receive a Certificate of Completion in Character Animation and create a demo reel.

Awards
The school has won several awards, including the 2006 Best Practices in Programming Award Gold Level, 21st Century Distance Learning Award from the U.S. Distance Learning Association, and was an honoree at the 10th Annual Webby Awards.

The school won the 2008 PRSA Bronze Anvil Award for its white paper "Behind the Characters: Job Satisfaction, Career Outlook, and Salary Survey Report" and was again named an official honoree at the 13th Annual Webby Awards. In 2008, Sony Pictures Imageworks awarded its top scholarship to Luis Rodrigo Huerta to earn a Master’s Degree at Texas A&M and participate in online animation courses at Animation Mentor.

Notable Animation Mentor alumni and productions
Students  who have graduated from Animation Mentor have worked on box office features, including Frozen, Inside Out, How to Train Your Dragon, How to Train Your Dragon 2, Peanuts, Horton Hears a Who!, Pirates of the Caribbean, Bee Movie, Monsters vs. Aliens, Ice Age: Dawn of the Dinosaurs, Kung Fu Panda, Bolt, Garfield: The Movie, Transformers, Spider-Man: Into the Spider-Verse, and others.

References

Further reading and listening 
Interview with Co-founders
 CG Society Interviews Co-founders
 Interview with Shawn Kelly and Carlos Baena

External links
 Animation Mentor website

Distance education institutions based in the United States
Universities and colleges in Alameda County, California
Video game universities
For-profit universities and colleges in the United States
Educational institutions established in 2005
Emeryville, California
Companies based in Emeryville, California
Animation schools in the United States
Private universities and colleges in California
2005 establishments in California